Scopula anaitisaria is a moth of the family Geometridae. It was described by Francis Walker in 1861. It is found in southern India.

References

Moths described in 1861
anaitisaria
Moths of Asia
Taxa named by Francis Walker (entomologist)